Scott Fletcher may refer to:

Scott Fletcher (baseball) (born 1958), former infielder in Major League Baseball
Scott Fletcher (entrepreneur) (born 1973), British entrepreneur
Scott Fletcher (ice hockey) (born 1988), American ice hockey defenceman
Michael Scott Fletcher, commonly known as Scott Fletcher, Australian Methodist minister